Silver Style Entertainment (later known as Silver Style Studios) was a video game developer based in Berlin, Germany, founded in 1993 by Carsten Strehse. In 2006, the company was taken over by The Games Company, and became an in-house development studio. Originally, the company developed largely for the PC, but following the acquisition it has shifted its focus to include consoles such as the Xbox 360.

After its mother company The Games Company became insolvent, the company continued to exist under the new name Silver Style Studios, without its original founder, Carsten Strehse. Four years later, the newly named company became insolvent as well.

Games

Goin' Downtown
Gorasul: The Legacy of the Dragon
Simon the Sorcerer 4: Chaos Happens
Simon the Sorcerer: Who'd Even Want Contact?!
Soldiers of Anarchy
The Fall: Last Days of Gaia
The Fall: Mutant City
The Dark Eye: Demonicon (2012) (transferred to Kalypso Media and Noumena Studios)
The Dark Eye: Herokon Online

References

External links
Silver Style Entertainment at MobyGames

Companies based in Berlin
Video game companies established in 1993
Video game companies disestablished in 2010
Defunct video game companies of Germany
Video game development companies